The Singapore League Cup was an annual soccer competition in Singapore. It was launched in 2007, and was open to teams who play in the S.League.

The 2007 competition was sponsored by SingTel, and officially titled the SingTel League Cup. Eight of the twelve S.League teams took part in the 2007 tournament, which was held before the start of the S.League season proper.

In 2008, the competition's official sponsored name was the Avaya-J&J League Cup (with sponsorship coming from Avaya and Jebsen & Jessen Communications). All twelve S.League teams took part in the 2008 tournament. Unlike the 2007 event, the 2008 competition was held during the S.League season.

The 2009 edition of the League Cup was held from 1 to 19 June, again during the S.League season. The competition began with a group stage, where the clubs were divided into four groups of three. The top two teams from each group qualified for the knockout stage. All knockout matches were played at the Jalan Besar Stadium. Live television coverage was provided by Starhub.

2010 saw the League Cup returning to a knockout format. The teams which finished in the top 4 positions in the 2009 S.League season were given byes to the quarter-final round, and the remaining clubs played a qualifying round to decide who would join them in the Cup competition. The draw was conducted before the qualifying round, which meant that qualifying clubs already knew which quarter-final slot they would be playing for.

The 2011 League Cup final on 30 June 2011 saw Albirex Niigata (S) defeat Hougang United FC 5-4 on penalties to become the third consecutive foreign club to hold the trophy after DPMM FC and Étoile FC.

The 2014 tournament was sponsored by StarHub, and officially titled the StarHub League Cup. The 2015 edition was sponsored by The New Paper and known as The New Paper League Cup.

The title sponsor for 2016 was The New Paper.

In 2018, The Singapore League Cup was dropped to ease fixture congestion.

Previous League Cup tournament (1997) 

A competition called the Singapore League Cup was also held in Singapore in 1997. In that year it was won by the Singapore Armed Forces who defeated Geylang United 1-0 in the final. In 1998, that competition was renamed the Singapore Cup, and was opened to teams that do not play in the S.League. The Singapore Cup is now the major cup competition in Singapore football, and in recent years has involved invited teams from overseas in addition to teams playing in Singapore's local leagues.

Past results

Plate Tournament
From 2012, a Plate Tournament was launched for the four teams that finished third in their respective groups.

Performance by Clubs

See also 
 Singapore Premier League
 Singapore Cup
 Singapore Community Shield
 Singapore National Football League
 Football Association of Singapore
 List of football clubs in Singapore

References

External links
Singapore - List of Cup Winners, RSSSF.com

 
League Cup
National association football league cups
Recurring sporting events established in 1997
Recurring sporting events disestablished in 2017
1997 establishments in Singapore
2017 disestablishments in Singapore